Arthur Phillips (September 12, 1930 – March 29, 2013) served as the 32nd mayor of Vancouver, British Columbia, Canada from 1973 to 1977.  Prior to being elected to this post, he founded the Vancouver investment firm of Phillips, Hager & North.  Phillips was instrumental in founding a reform-minded, centrist municipal-level political party, TEAM (The Electors' Action Movement), in 1968.  Also in that year, he was elected as an alderman to Vancouver City Council.

Under Phillips' mayoral leadership, the city of Vancouver took a more cautious approach to real estate and related development and ensured that environmental and quality-of-life concerns were addressed by city planners.

Phillips was elected to the Parliament of Canada in 1979 as a Liberal, but was defeated the following year in his bid for re-election. After Phillips' defeat, he returned to private life at his investment firm.  By 2007, Phillips, Hager & North had become a leading investment firm on the west coast, with over $66 billion of assets under management.

His wife, Carole Taylor, served as a Vancouver alderman in the 1980s and then as chair of the Canadian Broadcasting Corporation. In the 2005 British Columbia election she won election to the British Columbia Legislative Assembly as a Liberal and was subsequently appointed Minister of Finance in Gordon Campbell's cabinet.

During his undergraduate years at the University of British Columbia (B.Com., 1953), Phillips was a member of the British Columbia Alpha chapter of the Phi Delta Theta fraternity and was their chapter President in 1950.

Electoral history

References

External links
 

1930 births
2013 deaths
Anglophone Quebec people
Liberal Party of Canada MPs
Mayors of Vancouver
Members of the House of Commons of Canada from British Columbia
Politicians from Montreal
UBC Thunderbirds basketball players
UBC Sauder School of Business alumni
20th-century Canadian politicians